The Employment Tribunals Act 1996 (c 17) is a UK Act of Parliament, relating to UK labour law, that establishes the Employment Tribunals and Employment Appeal Tribunal, and sets their jurisdiction.

Contents
Part I concerns Employment Tribunals. Section 1 allows the Secretary of State to make provisions for Employment Tribunals. Sections 2 to 3 concern the Tribunal's jurisdiction. Sections 2 to 3 concern Membership of the tribunals, pay and training. Sections 6 to 15 elaborate on procedure through hearings, practice directions, mediation, pre-hearing reviews, confidential information, publicity and costs and enforcement. Sections 16 and 17 concern recoupment of social security benefits. Sections 18 to 19A deal with conciliation procedures.

Part II concerns the Employment Appeal Tribunal. Sections 20 to 37 concern the EAT's jurisdiction, membership, procedure, decisions and further appeals.

Part III contains supplementary provisions, in sections 38 to 42, while final provisions are in sections 43 to 48.

See also
UK labour law

United Kingdom labour law
United Kingdom Acts of Parliament 1996